Stay Tuned is a studio album by Chet Atkins, released in 1985 on Columbia Records. His guests included George Benson, Mark Knopfler, Steve Lukather, and Earl Klugh.

Stay Tuned was the first "Nashville" album promoted specifically to compact disc purchasers.

"Cosmic Square Dance" won the 1985 Grammy for Best Country Instrumental Performance.

The album peaked at No. 145 on the Billboard 200.

Reception

AllMusic critic Cub Koda wrote of the album: "Atkins' tone is, as usual, faultless, and his playing superb. If the 'meetings' don't always come off, it's usually due to the overzealousness of the other guitar players.... All in all, a good modern-day Chet Atkins album, but not the place to start a collection." The Rolling Stone Album Guide wrote that "while the tunes are formulaic, the playing is impressive."

Track listing
 "Sunrise" (G. Benson, Randy Goodrum) – 4:06
 "Please Stay Tuned" (Atkins, Paul Yandell) – 4:01
 "Quiet Eyes" (Russell) – 3:33
 "A Mouse in the House" (Moss) – 3:52
 "Some Leather and Lace" (Atkins, Yandell) – 3:56
 "The Cricket Ballet" (Darryl Dybka) – 3:30
 "Cosmic Square Dance" (Atkins, Mark Knopfler, Paul Yandell) – 4:14
 "The Boot and the Stone" (Dybka) – 3:57
 "Tap Room" – 4:08
 "If I Should Lose You" (Ralph Rainger, Leo Robin) – 1:26

Personnel
 Chet Atkins – guitar
 George Benson – guitar
 Larry Carlton – guitar
 Earl Klugh – guitar
 Mark Knopfler – guitar
 Steve Lukather – guitar
 Brent Mason – guitar
 Dean Parks – guitar
 Paul Yandell – guitar
 David Hungate – bass guitar
 Mark O'Connor – fiddle
 Boots Randolph – saxophone
 Jim Horn – horns
 Don Sheffield – horns
 Darryl Dybka – keyboards
 Randy Goodrum - keyboards
 Clayton Ivey – keyboards
 Shane Keister – keyboards
 Mark Hammond – drums
 Larrie Londin – drums
 Jeff Porcaro – drums
 Paulinho Da Costa – percussion
 Terry McMillan – percussion

Production notes
Bergen White - string and horn arrangement
George Butler - remix supervision
Mike Poston - engineering
Ernie Winfrey - string section engineering
Don Hahn - remix engineering
Joe Borja - engineering assistance
Bernie Grundman - mastering

References

1985 albums
Chet Atkins albums
Albums produced by Chet Atkins
Columbia Records albums